The Evolution of Human Languages (EHL) project is a historical-comparative linguistics research project hosted by the Santa Fe Institute. It aims to provide a detailed genealogical classification of the world's languages.

The project was founded in 2001 by Nobel laureate Murray Gell-Mann when he decided to partner with Sergei Starostin and Merritt Ruhlen to map out the evolutionary tree of human languages. Initial funding was provided by the Santa Fe Institute and the MacArthur Foundation. It is currently led by Russian linguist Georgiy Starostin, the son of Sergei Starostin.

Many of the project's members belong to the Moscow School of Comparative Linguistics, including Georgiy Starostin and Ilia Peiros. Other project members include Vaclav Blazek, John D. Bengtson, Edward Vajda, and other linguists.

Overview
The Evolution of Human Languages (EHL) is an international project – of which Georgiy Starostin inherited his father's membership – on "the linguistic prehistory of humanity" coordinated by the Santa Fe Institute. The project distinguishes about 6,000 languages currently spoken around the world, and aims to provide a detailed classification similar to the accepted classification of biological species.

Their idea is that "all representatives of the species Homo sapiens presumably share a common origin, [so] it would be natural to suppose – although this is a goal yet to be achieved – that all human languages also go back to some common source. Most existing classifications, however, do not go beyond some 300-400 language families that are relatively easy to discern. This restriction has natural reasons: languages must have been spoken and constantly evolving for at least 40,000 years (and quite probably more), while any two languages separated from a common source inevitably lose almost all superficially common features after some 6,000-7,000 years".

The  is an international etymological database project that is part of the Evolution of Human Languages project.

Global Lexicostatistical Database

The database makes use of the Unified Transcription System (UTS), designed specifically for the database.

110-word list

The Global Lexicostatistical Database includes basic word lists of 110 items each for many of the world's languages. The 110-word list is a modified 100-item Swadesh list consisting of the original 100 Swadesh list items, in addition to the following 10 additional words from the Swadesh–Yakhontov list:

far
heavy
near
salt
short
snake
thin
wind
worm
year

The 110-word expanded Swadesh list by Kassian et al. (2010) is as follows.

{| class="wikitable sortable"
! no. !! English !! Russian
|-
| 1 || all || все
|-
| 2 || ashes || зола
|-
| 3 || bark || кора
|-
| 4 || belly || живот
|-
| 5 || big, large || большой
|-
| 6 || bird || птица
|-
| 7 || to bite || кусать
|-
| 8 || black || черный
|-
| 9 || blood || кровь
|-
| 10 || bone || кость
|-
| 11 || breast || грудь
|-
| 12 || to burn (trans.) || жечь, сжечь
|-
| 13 || cloud || облако
|-
| 14 || cold || холодный
|-
| 15 || to come || приходить
|-
| 16 || to die || умирать
|-
| 17 || dog || собака
|-
| 18 || to drink || пить
|-
| 19 || dry || сухой
|-
| 20 || ear || ухо
|-
| 21 || earth || земля
|-
| 22 || to eat || есть
|-
| 23 || egg || яйцо
|-
| 24 || eye || глаз
|-
| 25 || fat || жир
|-
| 26 || feather || перо
|-
| 27 || fire || огонь
|-
| 28 || fish || рыба
|-
| 29 || to fly || лететь, летать
|-
| 30 || foot || нога
|-
| 31 || full || полный
|-
| 32 || to give || давать
|-
| 33 || to go || идти
|-
| 34 || good || хороший
|-
| 35 || green || зеленый
|-
| 36 || hair || волосы
|-
| 37 || hand || рука
|-
| 38 || head || голова
|-
| 39 || to hear || слышать
|-
| 40 || heart || сердце
|-
| 41 || horn || рог
|-
| 42a || I || я
|-
| 42b || me || меня
|-
| 43 || to kill || убивать
|-
| 44 || knee || колено
|-
| 45 || to know || знать
|-
| 46 || leaf || лист
|-
| 47 || to lie || лежать
|-
| 48 || liver || печень
|-
| 49 || long || длинный
|-
| 50 || louse || вошь
|-
| 51 || man (male) || мужчина
|-
| 52 || man (person) || человек
|-
| 53 || many, a lot of || много
|-
| 54 || meat || мясо
|-
| 55 || moon || луна
|-
| 56 || mountain || гора
|-
| 57 || mouth || рот
|-
| 58 || nail || ноготь
|-
| 59 || name || имя
|-
| 61 || new || новый
|-
| 62 || night || ночь
|-
| 63 || nose || нос
|-
| 64 || not || не
|-
| 65 || one || один
|-
| 66 || rain || дождь
|-
| 67 || red || красный
|-
| 68 || road || дорога
|-
| 69 || root || корень
|-
| 70a || round (3D) || круглый
|-
| 70b || round (2D) || круглый
|-
| 71 || sand || песок
|-
| 72 || to say || сказать
|-
| 73 || to see || видеть
|-
| 74 || seed || семя
|-
| 75 || to sit || сидеть
|-
| 76 || skin || кожа
|-
| 77 || to sleep || спать
|-
| 78 || small, little || маленький
|-
| 79 || smoke || дым
|-
| 80 || to stand || стоять
|-
| 81 || star || звезда
|-
| 82 || stone || камень
|-
| 83 || sun || солнце
|-
| 84 || to swim || плыть, плавать
|-
| 85 || tail || хвост
|-
| 86 || that || тот
|-
| 87 || this || этот
|-
| 88 || tongue || язык
|-
| 89 || tooth || зуб
|-
| 90 || tree || дерево
|-
| 91 || two || два
|-
| 92 || warm || теплый
|-
| 93 || water || вода
|-
| 94a || we (incl.) || мы (incl.)
|-
| 94b || we (incl.) || мы (incl.)
|-
| 94c–d || we (excl.) || мы (excl.)
|-
| 95 || what || что
|-
| 96 || white || белый
|-
| 97 || who || кто
|-
| 98 || woman || женщина
|-
| 99 || yellow || желтый
|-
| 100a || you (thou) || ты
|-
| 100b || you (thou) || тебя
|-
| 101 || far || далеко
|-
| 102 || heavy || тяжелый
|-
| 103 || near || близко
|-
| 104 || salt || соль
|-
| 105 || short || короткий
|-
| 106 || snake || змея
|-
| 107a || thin (2D) || тонкий
|-
| 107b || thin (1D) || тонкий
|-
| 108 || wind || ветер
|-
| 109 || worm || червь
|-
| 110 || year || год
|}

50-word list
A 50-word list of "ultra-stable" items for lexicostatiscal use with the database was also proposed in 2010. The 50-word list is an abridged version of the 110-word list.

{| class="wikitable sortable"
! no. !! English !! Russian
|-
| 1 || we || мы
|-
| 2 || two || два
|-
| 3 || I || я
|-
| 4 || eye || глаз
|-
| 5 || thou || ты
|-
| 6 || who || кто
|-
| 7 || fire || огонь
|-
| 8 || tongue || язык
|-
| 9 || stone || камень
|-
| 10 || name || имя
|-
| 11 || hand || рука
|-
| 12 || what || что
|-
| 13 || die || умирать
|-
| 14 || heart || сердце
|-
| 15 || drink || пить
|-
| 16 || dog || собака
|-
| 17 || louse (head) || вошь
|-
| 18 || moon || луна
|-
| 19 || fingernail || ноготь
|-
| 20 || blood || кровь
|-
| 21 || one || один
|-
| 22 || tooth || зуб
|-
| 23 || new || новый
|-
| 24 || dry (e.g. of clothes) || сухой
|-
| 25 || eat || есть
|-
| 26 || tail || хвост
|-
| 27 || hair (of head) || волосы
|-
| 28 || water || вода
|-
| 29 || nose || нос
|-
| 30 || not || не
|-
| 31 || mouth || рот
|-
| 32 || ear || ухо
|-
| 33 || bird || птица
|-
| 34 || bone || кость
|-
| 35 || sun || солнце
|-
| 36 || smoke || дым
|-
| 37 || tree || дерево
|-
| 38 || ashes || зола
|-
| 39 || rain || дождь
|-
| 40 || star || звезда
|-
| 41 || leaf || лист
|-
| 42 || kill || убивать
|-
| 43 || foot || нога
|-
| 44 || horn || рог
|-
| 45 || hear || слышать
|-
| 46 || meat (as food) || мясо
|-
| 47 || egg || яйцо
|-
| 48 || black || черный
|-
| 49 || head || голова
|-
| 50 || night || ночь
|}

See also
Moscow School of Comparative Linguistics
Cross-Linguistic Linked Data
Genographic Project

References

External links
 The Tower of Babel: Evolution of Human Language Project by Georgiy Starostin
 The Global Lexicostatistical Database
 Santa Fe Institute homepage

Videos
 Murray Gell-Mann and the Evolution of Human Languages (Santa Fe Institute video)
 Murray Gell-Mann: Do all languages have a common ancestor? (TED talk in 2008)

Long-range comparative linguistics
Moscow School of Comparative Linguistics
Linguistic research
Lexical databases
Word lists